Magnetix is a magnetic construction toy consisting of a combination of plastic building pieces containing embedded neodymium magnets, and steel bearing balls that can be connected to form geometric shapes and structures. Designed to be a cheaper version of the Geomag magnetic construction set, Magnetix's image suffered severely when an early manufacturing defect caused a death, and was subsequently sold under several different brands after the defect was corrected.

Panel shapes include two types of interlocking triangles, interlockable squares, and circle or disks. The triangles and squares identify the North-South polarity of one of their embedded magnets. The disks identify all four magnets.

Popularity

According to TD Monthly, a trade magazine for the toy industry, Magnetix sets were among the top 10 most-wanted building sets in 2005, and top sellers on web sites including Amazon.com, KB Toys.com, and Walmart.com.

Product recalls by US Consumer Product Safety Commission

On March 31, 2006, the Consumer Product Safety Commission (CPSC) ordered a recall of all Magnetix brand magnetic building sets. The official CPSC recall notice was issued after one death of a small child and four serious injuries requiring surgery. "Consumers should stop using recalled products immediately unless otherwise instructed," according to the recall notice. Other brands of magnetic builders, such as Geomag were not recalled.

On April 19, 2007, the CPSC ordered further Magnetix recalls, recalling over 4 million sets. "To date, CPSC and Mega Brands are aware of one death, one aspiration and 27 intestinal injuries. Emergency surgical intervention was needed in all but one case. At least 1,500 incidents of magnets separating from the building pieces have been reported. ... If a child swallows more than one tiny powerful magnet detached from the plastic building pieces or one such magnet and a metallic object, the objects can attract to each other inside the intestines and cause perforations and/or blockage, which can be fatal, if not treated immediately." Redesigned Magnetix sets sold since March 31, 2006, that are age-labeled 6+, are not subject to the recall.

As early as 2004, medical professionals were warning the medical community about the dangers of "multiple magnet ingestion", but the case studies never made it into the popular press. A pediatric gastroenterologist, Dr. Marsha Kay of the Cleveland Clinic, is one of the first to write an article for the public on steps to take if a child is suspected of swallowing a magnet.

References

External links
 MEGA Brands Product Recalls
 Toddler dies after ingesting magnetic toy Newspaper story from 2005 (archived December 30 2010)
 Official Magnetix Product Recall Notice (March 31, 2006) from U.S. Government Consumer Product Safety Commission
 Official Magnetix Expanded Product Recall Notice (April 19, 2007) from U.S. Government Consumer Product Safety Commission
 "Toy Remains in Stores After Child's Death" (Washington Post story)
 Mega Brands' Magnetix promotional site
 Mega Brands America To Pay $1.1 Million Civil Penalty For Reporting Violations With Popular Magnetic Building Sets news release from the U.S. Government Consumer Product Safety Commission, (May 18, 2009)

Construction toys
Toy recalls